Black Creek Nature Sanctuary, commonly referred to as Black Creek, is a  nature sanctuary located in Keweenaw County, Michigan. It is maintained and preserved by the non-profit organization Michigan Nature Association, and is only one of many parks and sanctuaries maintained by the association in Keweenaw County.

Access to the sanctuary is by a hiking trail of more than two miles (3 km) in length, and traverses a variety of environments. Vegetation includes blueberry, trailing arbutus, and wildflowers such as orchids. The trail ends at a lagoon formed by the convergence of Hill and Black Creeks where they empty into Lake Superior. Hill Creek flows through several feet of old stamp sand left over from the copper mining era in the 1860s. The rock bearing the copper was crushed, or "stamped", to remove the ore, hence the term "stamp sand".

A small footpath marks the entrance to Black Creek near the end of Sedar Road between Calumet and Allouez. The trail will take you to the Lake Superior shoreline as well as the beaver marshes, dune habitat, and conifers that surround the creeks.

References

External links 
The Michigan Nature Association

Nature reserves in Michigan
Protected areas of Keweenaw County, Michigan
Swamps of Michigan
Protected areas established in 1991
1991 establishments in Michigan